Hit Sport Club, is an Iraqi football team based in Hit District, Al-Anbar, that plays in Iraq Division Two.

Managerial history
 Faleh Munif Moajel

See also 
 2020–21 Iraq FA Cup

References

External links
 Hit SC on Goalzz.com
 Iraq Clubs- Foundation Dates

1991 establishments in Iraq
Association football clubs established in 1991
Football clubs in Al-Anbar